Sadashiv Peth is an area located in Pune, in Maharashtra State of the Republic of India. It was founded by Madhavrao Peshwa in honour of Sadashivrao Peshwa.

Sadashiv Peth is predominantly occupied by  Maharashtrian Brahmins, especially Deshastha Brahmins and Chitpavan Brahmins, with a fair share of some other classes as well. Educational institutions like Bhave School, New English School, Renuka Swaroop School, Jnana Prabodhini Prashala, D.E.S school, SPM English School are located here. Sadashiv Peth has many temples like Khunya Muralidhar, Joshi  Narsimha Mandir, Junnarkar Datta Mandir, Upashi Vitthal, Shani Par, Nagnath Par, Chimnya Ganapati, Umbrya Ganpati, Bhikardas Maruti Mandir, Paranjape Shani Mandir. Many historic Wadas like Vishrambaug wada, Vinchurkar wada, etc. are situated in Sadashiv Peth, which is also home to the Bharat Itihas Sanshodak Mandal, Geeta Dharma Mandal, Bharat Natya Mandir and Tilak Smarak Mandir.

Sarasbaug, Peshwe Park and Maharana Pratap Udyan are the famous parks located in Sadashiv Peth.

It has traditional Maharashtrian cuisine restaurants. It falls under the Kasba Peth constituency and its current legislator is Mukta Tilak, BJP (Bharatiya Janata Party).

References

Peths in Pune